Miss USA 1967 was the 16th Miss USA pageant, won by Sylvia Hitchcock of Alabama. She was crowned by Miss USA 1966, Maria Remenyi of California. It took place at the Miami Beach Auditorium in Miami Beach, Florida on May 20, 1967. Hitchcock won Miss Universe 1967 two months later, her 2nd runner-up Cheryl Patton of Florida later became Miss USA because the 1st runner-up refused the title.

This was Bob Barker's first Miss USA Pageant as host, as well as his first time on the CBS network, 5 years before becoming a regular with the network as host of The Price Is Right from 1972 to 2007.

Final results

Historical significance 
 Alabama wins competition for the first time. Also becoming in the 13th state who does it for the first time. Incidentally, Hitchcock went on to become the fourth woman from the USA to win the Miss Universe title in 1967.
 California earns the 1st runner-up position for the second time. The last time it placed this was in 1961 and reaches the highest placement since Maria Remenyi won in the previous year. Was offered to take the Miss USA title when Sylvia Hitchcock became Miss Universe. She refused to take it.
 Florida earns the 2nd runner-up position for the second time. The last time it placed this was in 1959. Besides it became 14th state who wins the title first time after Sylvia Hitchcock went on to win Miss Universe 1967 and 1st runner up declined to succeed as Miss USA 1967.
 Wisconsin earns the 3rd runner-up position for the first time.
 Missouri earns the 4th runner-up position for the first time.
 States that placed in semifinals the previous year were Arizona, California, District of Columbia, Florida, Maryland, Tennessee and Texas.
 California placed for the eleventh consecutive year. 
 District of Columbia placed for the sixth consecutive year. 
 Texas placed for the fourth consecutive year. 
 Arizona placed for the third consecutive year. 
 Florida, Maryland and Tennessee made their second consecutive placement.
 Alabama and Nevada last placed in 1965.
 Oregon last placed in 1964.
 Illinois and Missouri last placed in 1963.
 Pennsylvania last placed in 1962.
 Wisconsin last placed in 1955.
 Virginia last placed in 1954.
 Hawaii breaks an ongoing streak of placements since 1965.
 Ohio and Utah break an ongoing streak of placements since 1964.
 New York breaks an ongoing streak of placements since 1957.
 This year is the first (beginning a streak) where all 50 states and the District of Columbia send delegates.

Delegates
The Miss USA 1967 delegates were:

  Alabama - Sylvia Hitchcock
  Alaska - Mary Lou Helfrich
  Arizona - Judianne Magnusson
  Arkansas - Katy Wurst
  California - Susan Bradley
  Colorado - Kim Kelly
  Connecticut - Linda Drew
  Delaware - Dianne Judefind
  District of Columbia - Myra Chudy
  Florida - Cheryl Patton
  Georgia - Jane Lineberger
  Hawaii - Nancy Victoria Banks
  Idaho - Charlene McArthur
  Illinois - Beverly Lacek
  Indiana - Pamela Talmadge
  Iowa - Kathleen Solt
  Kansas - Regina Wolfe
  Kentucky - Debbie Dibble
  Louisiana - Dianne Mader
  Maine - Denise Hill
  Maryland - Sandy Clevering
  Massachusetts - Pamela Procter
  Michigan - Sonja Dunson
  Minnesota - Betty Ann Brewer
  Mississippi - Lassie Cooke
  Missouri - Karen Hendrix
  Montana - Stevie Lahti
  Nebraska - Mary Hoth
  Nevada - Jacqueline Moore 
  New Hampshire - Jennifer Brown
  New Jersey - Jean Galata
  New Mexico - Clydia Newell
  New York - Wendy Cox
  North Carolina - Patti Jean Effron
  North Dakota - Jacqueline Linder
  Ohio - Sandra Kurdas
  Oklahoma - Becky Berry
  Oregon - Maureen Bassett
  Pennsylvania - Barbara Ann Woronko
  Rhode Island - Nancy Giuliano
  South Carolina - Hope Patterson
  South Dakota - Patricia Marshall
  Tennessee - Nancy Brackhahn
  Texas - Bonnie Robinson
  Utah - Marilyn Christiansen
  Vermont - Susan Parsons
  Virginia - Elizabeth Kallmyer
  Washington - Julie Kellmyer
  West Virginia - Pamela Young
  Wisconsin - Jody Bonham
  Wyoming - Helen Barker

See also 
 Miss Universe 1967

Notes

References

External links 
 Miss USA official website
 Pageantopolis - Official results of Miss USA 1952-1971

1967
1967 in the United States
1967 beauty pageants